The 1914 Sydney Carnival was the third edition of the Australian National Football Carnival, an Australian football interstate competition. It was held between Wednesday 5 August and Saturday 15 August 1914. Victoria was the winning state, going undefeated through the competition.

The carnival, which was the first to take place in New South Wales, was contested by teams from each of the six states: Victoria, South Australia, Western Australia, Tasmania, New South Wales and Queensland. Interest in the event was overshadowed by the declarations of war by Britain on Germany on 4 August, and the opening manoeuvres of World War I which followed. Altogether, the event made a loss, drawing at the gate enough to cover approximately half of its operating expenses.

Teams 
Six teams competed at the Carnival.

New South Wales
Walter Abotomey, Desmond Baird, Francis Ernest "Frank" Beaver, Reginald Horace Blackburn,  John "Con" Cannon, Leslie Glen Clarke, Walter Davis, Albert Herbert "Bert" Ellis, Albert V. Erickson, John "Jack" Fisher,  Walter Harris, Eric Emerson Hughes, Allan Raymond "Sacko" Jackson, William Henry Kumnick, Vincent "Bing" McCann, Harry A. McCullagh, Frederick Roy "Freddy Mack" McGargill, Francis Leo "Frank" McDonald, Edward Alexander McFadden,  Michael "Mick" McInerney, Frederick Arthur "Sailor" Meadows, James Howarth "Jim" Munro, Cornelius J. Murphy, Brutus E. "Bruce" O'Grady, George Parr, S.V. Peace, Andrew Thomas P. "Andy" Ratcliffe, Ralph "Robby" Robertson, Robert Sands, E. Stevens, R.W. Stevenson, Gerald Stewart, William "Billy" Thomas, E. Tyson, Albert Henry Vincent, William "Jack" Webb. Coach, Dick Condon; manager and assistant coach, Bill Strickland.

Queensland
D. Arnall, G. Beech, E. Bliss, E. Crouch, W. H. Cooke, A. J. Cowley, D. Duffy, W. East, A. Grieves, J. H. Hawke, P. W. Jones, C. Lawrence, S. McKinley, A. McPherson, A. C. McCaul, J. Minus, W. Maroney, D. Ogilvy, A. C. Roberts, A. E. Skuce, P. R. Willshire, G. Wilson, L. Wilson.

South Australia
W. Mayman, F. H. Golding, D. V. McDougall (Sturt), W. H. Oliver; J. C. Watson, F. G. Magor, J. W. Robertson, A. McFarlane, J. Ashley, A. Congear (Port Adelaide). F. H. Keen, J. J. Tredrea, F. M. Barry (South Adelaide), S. Patten, D. Low (West Torrens). A. Klose, E. Johns, T. Leahy, L. Thomas (North Adelaide), W. H. Dowling, J. R. Hanley, H. R. Head (West Adelaide), Manager, Mr. J. Hodge.

Tasmania
Absolom, Aulsebrook, R. Bailey, Bennison, Burton, Jack, Bastick J. Barnett, R. Coogan. R. Cooper, C. Dunn (vice-captain), J. Dunn, Flanagan, Goddard, Hanigan, J. Pennicott, Randall, L. Russell, Bailey (captain), Barnett, Margetts, Morrison, Pugh.

Victoria
Baud, Dick, Haughton (Carlton), Green, Jackson, W. H. Lee (Collingwood), C. Gove, P. Ogden (Essendon), Holden, Cooper, Johnson (Fitzroy), Grigg, Heinz, Marsham (Geelong), McNamara, Eicke, Schmidt (St Kilda), Lilley (Melbourne), Charge, Sloss (South Melbourne), Brake, Woods (University), James (Richmond).

West Australia
Smith, Hebbard, Robinson, Dan Scullion, Hurley, Daly, Sullivan, Slattery, Eddy (Goldfields), Burns, Limb, Sellars, Doig, Tapping, Youlden, Truscott, Thomas, McIntosh, Cain, Tomkins, Fisher, Oakley, Matson, Mose (Coastal League).

Umpires
Jack Elder from Victoria, Henry "Ivo" Crapp from West Australia, S. F. Carter from South Australia, and L. J. Pitcher (New South Wales).

Results

Ladder

Other awards and events 
At the completion of the tournament, the best player from each state was awarded a gold medal, also known as Referee Medals, named after the Sydney newspaper. The winners were:
 George Heinz (Victoria)
 John W. Robertson (South Australia)
 Albert Tapping (Western Australia)
 Ralph Robertson (New South Wales)
 Jack Pennicott (Tasmania)
 P.W. Jones (Queensland).

Additional events held as part of the carnival included a series of junior and schoolboys' representative matches, played in timeslots not occupied by senior matches, as well as a goalkicking competition and a long-distance kicking competition, in both of which the best Australian rules football players in each discipline faced off against rugby league star Dally Messenger.
 In the goalkicking competition, Herbert Limb (Western Australia) won the preliminary round amongst the Australian rules footballers. Messenger then defeated Limb in the final.
 In the distance kicking competition, Dave McNamara (Victoria) won with a distance of 67yds 8in from a place kick (before later kicking 76 yards in an out-of-competition kick); Alex Robinson (Western Australia) was second with a distance of 65 yards.

Notes

References 
 
 
 

Australian rules interstate football
Sydney Carnival, 1914
August 1914 sports events